The Panic of 1893 was an economic depression in the  United States that began in 1893 and ended in 1897.  It deeply affected every sector of the economy, and produced political upheaval that led to the political realignment of 1896 and the presidency of William McKinley.

Causes 

The Panic of 1893 has been traced to many causes, one of them pointing to Argentina; investment was encouraged by the Argentine agent bank, Baring Brothers. However, the 1890 wheat crop failure and a failed coup in Buenos Aires ended further investments. In addition, speculations in South African and Australian properties also collapsed. Because European investors were concerned that these problems might spread, they started a run on gold in the U.S. Treasury. Specie was considered more valuable than paper money; when people were uncertain about the future, they hoarded specie and rejected paper notes.

During the Gilded Age of the 1870s and 1880s, the United States had experienced economic growth and expansion, but much of this expansion depended on high international commodity prices.  Exacerbating the problems with international investments, wheat prices crashed in 1893.  In particular, the opening of numerous mines in the western United States led to an oversupply of silver, leading to significant debate as to how much of the silver should be coined into money (see below).  During the 1880s, American railroads experienced what might today be called a "bubble": investors flocked to railroads, and they were greatly over-built.

One of the first clear signs of trouble came on 20 February 1893, twelve days before the inauguration of U.S. President Grover Cleveland, with the appointment of receivers for the Philadelphia and Reading Railroad, which had greatly overextended itself.  Upon taking office, Cleveland dealt directly with the Treasury crisis and successfully convinced Congress to repeal the Sherman Silver Purchase Act, which he felt was mainly responsible for the economic crisis.

As concern for the state of the economy deepened, people rushed to withdraw their money from banks, and caused bank runs. The credit crunch rippled through the economy. A financial panic in London combined with a drop in continental European trade caused foreign investors to sell American stocks to obtain American funds backed by gold.

The economic policies of President Benjamin Harrison have been characterized as a contributing factor to the depression.

Populists 

The People's Party, also known as the 'Populists', was an agrarian-populist political party in the United States. From 1892 to 1896, it played a major role as a left-wing force in American politics. It drew support from angry farmers in the West and South. It was highly critical of capitalism, especially banks and railroads, and allied itself with the labor movement.

Established in 1891 as a result of the Populist movement, the People's Party reached its height in the 1892 presidential election, when its ticket, consisting of James B. Weaver and James G. Field, won 8.5% of the popular vote and carried five states (Colorado, Idaho, Kansas, Nevada, and North Dakota), and the 1894 House of Representatives elections when it won nine seats. Built on a coalition of poor, white cotton farmers in the South (especially North Carolina, Alabama and Texas) and hard-pressed wheat farmers in the Plains States (especially Kansas and Nebraska), the Populists represented a radical form of agrarianism and hostility to elites, cities, banks, railroads, and gold.

Silver

The Free Silver movement arose from a synergy of farming and mining interests. Farmers sought to invigorate the economy and thereby end deflation, which was forcing them to repay loans with increasingly expensive dollars. Mining interests sought the right to turn silver directly into money without a central minting institution. The Sherman Silver Purchase Act of 1890, while falling short of the Free Silver movement's goals, required the U.S. government to buy millions of ounces of silver above what was required by the 1878 Bland–Allison Act (driving up the price of silver and pleasing silver miners). People attempted to redeem silver notes for gold. Ultimately, the statutory limit for the minimum amount of gold in federal reserves was reached and U.S. notes could no longer be successfully redeemed for gold. Investments during the time of the panic were heavily financed through bond issues with high-interest payments. Rumors regarding the National Cordage Company (NCC)'s financial distress (NCC was the most actively traded stock at the time) caused its lenders to call in their loans immediately, and the company went into bankruptcy receivership as a result. The company, a rope manufacturer, had tried to corner the market for imported hemp. As demand for silver and silver notes fell, the price and value of silver dropped. Holders worried about a loss of face value of bonds, and many became worthless.

A series of bank failures followed, and the Northern Pacific Railway, the Union Pacific Railroad and the Atchison, Topeka & Santa Fe Railroad failed. This was followed by the bankruptcy of many other companies; in total over 15,000 companies and 500 banks, many of them in the West, failed. The huge spike in unemployment, combined with the loss of life savings kept in failed banks, meant that a once-secure middle-class could not meet their mortgage obligations. Many walked away from recently built homes as a result.

Effects

As a result of the panic, stock prices declined. Five hundred banks closed, 15,000 businesses failed, and numerous farms ceased operation. The unemployment rate hit 25% in Pennsylvania, 35% in New York, and 43% in Michigan. Soup kitchens were opened to help feed the destitute. Facing starvation, people chopped wood, broke rocks, and sewed by hand with needle and thread in exchange for food. In some cases, women resorted to prostitution to feed their families. To help the people of Detroit, Mayor Hazen S. Pingree launched his "Potato Patch Plan", which were community gardens for farming.

President Grover Cleveland was blamed for the depression. Gold reserves stored in the U.S. Treasury fell to a dangerously low level. This forced President Cleveland to borrow $65 million in gold from Wall Street banker J.P. Morgan and the Rothschild banking family of England. His party suffered enormous losses in the 1894 elections, largely being blamed for the downward spiral in the economy and the brutal crushing of the Pullman Strike. After their defeat in 1896, the Democrats did not regain control of any branch of the Federal Government until 1910.

Shipping

The Panic of 1893 affected many aspects of the shipping industry, both by rail and by sea. It arrested the acquisition of ships and rolling stock and pushed down shipping rates.

Fluctuations in railroad investment after the Panic of 1893
The bad omen of investors switching from equity based stocks to constant return bonds in 1894 was mirrored in the corporate finance actions of railroads which reduced their acquisition of rolling stock. Railroad expansion including capital expenditures rose again in 1895, but slowed in 1897 during another economic trough.

Receivership
In 1893, the total railroad mileage in the U.S. was 176,803.6 miles. In 1894 and 1895, railroads only expanded 4,196.4 miles, although 100,000 miles of rail was added from 1878 to 1896. In 1893, the year following the panic, one fourth of all rail mileage went into receivership. The U.S. Census placed this value at close to $1.8 billion (not adjusted for inflation), the largest amount recorded between 1876 and 1910. This was over $1 billion (also not adjusted for inflation) more than the next largest amount, in 1884.

Pullman Strike
In 1894, the U.S. Army intervened during a strike in Chicago to prevent property damage. The Pullman Strike began at the Pullman Company in Chicago after Pullman refused to either lower rent in the company town or raise wages for its workers due to increased economic pressure from the Panic of 1893. Since the Pullman Company was a railroad car company, this only increased the difficulty of acquiring rolling stock.

American merchant tonnage
The maritime industry of the United States did not escape the effects of the Panic of 1893. The total gross registered merchant marine tonnage employed in "foreign and coastwise trade and in the fisheries", as measured by the U.S. Census between 1888 and 1893, grew at a rate of about 2.74%. In 1894, however, U.S. gross tonnage decreased by 2.9%, and again in 1895 by 1.03%.

Rates
In 1894, the rate for a bushel of wheat by rail dropped from 14.70¢ in 1893 to 12.88¢. This rate continued to decrease, reaching a terminal rate in 1901 of 9.92¢ and never reached 12 cents between 1898 and 1910.

Between 1893 and 1894, average shipping rates by lake or canal per wheat bushel decreased by almost 2 cents, from 6.33¢ to 4.44¢. Rates on the transatlantic crossing from New York City to Liverpool also decreased, from 2 and 3/8 to 1 and 15/16, but this reflected a trend downward since 1891.

See also
 Black Friday (1869) – also referred to as the "Gold Panic of 1869"
 Basic City, Virginia
 Denver Depression of 1893
 The Driver, a 1922 novel set during the panic
 Long Depression
 Panic of 1896
 Second-term curse

References

Further reading

Contemporary sources

 American Annual Cyclopedia...1894 (1895) online
Baum, Lyman Frank and W. W. Denslow.  The Wonderful Wizard of Oz (1900); see Political interpretations of The Wonderful Wizard of Oz
Brice, Lloyd Stephens, and James J. Wait. "The Railway Problem."  North American Review  164 (March 1897): 327–48. online at MOA Cornell.
Cleveland, Frederick A. "The Final Report of the Monetary Commission," Annals of the American Academy of Political and Social Science 13 (January 1899): 31–56 in JSTOR
Closson, Carlos C. Jr. "The Unemployed in American Cities." Quarterly Journal of Economics, vol. 8, no. 2 (January 1894) 168–217 in JSTOR; vol. 8, no. 4 (July 1894): 443–77 in JSTOR
Fisher, Willard. "‘Coin’ and His Critics."  Quarterly Journal of Economics  10 (January 1896): 187–208 in JSTOR
Harvey, William H. Coin’s Financial School (1894), 1963 (Introduction by Richard Hofstadter). online first edition
Noyes, Alexander Dana. "The Banks and the Panic,"  Political Science Quarterly  9 (March 1894): 12–28 in  JSTOR.
Shaw, Albert. "Relief for the Unemployed in American Cities," Review of Reviews 9 (January and February 1894): 29–37, 179–91.
Stevens, Albert Clark. "An Analysis of the Phenomena of the Panic in the United States in 1893,"  Quarterly Journal of Economics  8 (January 1894): 117–48 in JSTOR.

Secondary sources

Barnes, James A.  John G. Carlisle: Financial Statesman (1931).

Destler, Chester McArthur. American Radicalism, 1865–1901 (1966).
Dewey, Davis Rich. Financial History of the United States (1903). online.
Dighe, Ranjit S. ed. The Historian's Wizard of Oz: Reading L. Frank Baum's Classic as a Political and Monetary Allegory (2002).
Dorfman, Joseph Harry.  The Economic Mind in American Civilization. (1949). vol 3.
Faulkner, Harold Underwood.  Politics, Reform, and Expansion, 1890–1900. (1959).
Feder, Leah Hanna. Unemployment Relief in Periods of Depression ... 1857–1920 (1926).
Friedman, Milton, and Anna Jacobson Schwartz. A Monetary History of the United States, 1867–1960 (1963).
 Harpine, William D. From the Front Porch to the Front Page: McKinley and Bryan in the 1896 Presidential Campaign (2006) excerpt and text search

Hoffmann, Charles. The Depression of the Nineties: An Economic History (1970).
Jensen, Richard. The Winning of the Midwest: 1888–1896 (1971).
Josephson, Matthew. The Robber Barons New York: Harcourt Brace Jovanovich (1990).
Kirkland, Edward Chase. Industry Comes of Age, 1860–1897 (1961).
Lauck, William Jett. The Causes of the Panic of 1893 (1907). online
Lindsey, Almont. The Pullman Strike 1942.

Nevins, Allan. Grover Cleveland: A Study in Courage. 1932, Pulitzer Prize.

Ritter, Gretchen. Goldbugs and Greenbacks: The Anti-Monopoly Tradition and the Politics of Finance in America (1997)

Schwantes, Carlos A. Coxey’s Army: An American Odyssey (1985).
Shannon, Fred Albert. The Farmer’s Last Frontier: Agriculture, 1860–1897 (1945).
Steeples, Douglas, and David O. Whitten. Democracy in Desperation: The Depression of 1893 (1998).
Strouse, Jean. Morgan: American Financier (1999).
White; Gerald T. The United States and the Problem of Recovery after 1893 (1982).
Whitten, David. EH.NET article on the Depression of 1893
 Wicker, Elmus. Banking panics of the gilded age (Cambridge University Press, 2006) contents

External links

 Causes of the Business Depression by Henry George; appeared in Once a Week, a New York periodical,  March 6, 1894

1893 in the United States
Financial crises
Economic crises in the United States
1893
19th-century economic history
1893 in economics